Fenerbahçe Ülker is the professional men's basketball department of Fenerbahçe S.K., a major multisport club based in Istanbul, Turkey.

For the season roster: 2010-11 Roster

Group C regular season
The Regular Season began in October 2010 and concluded in December 2010.

Results
All times given below are in Central European Time.

Group H Top 16
Top 16 began in January 2011 and will conclude in March 2011.

Results
All times given below are in Central European Time.

References

External links
Official Fenerbahçe site 
Euro League Page 
TBLStat.net 
Euroleague Format
Euroleague.net
Fenerbahçe fansite 

2010-11
2010–11 Euroleague by club
2010–11 in Turkish basketball by club